Phtheochroa lucentana is a species of moth of the family Tortricidae. It is found in northern Syria and Turkey.

References

Moths described in 1899
Phtheochroa